Seedhill is the name of two sports venues in the town of Nelson, Lancashire. These stadia are:

Seedhill Football Ground, former home of English football team Nelson F.C.
Seedhill Cricket Ground, home of Lancashire League side Nelson Cricket Club, England